The Nordic Junior Combined Events Championships is an annual outdoor combined track and field events competition for athletes under-20 from the Nordic countries – Sweden, Norway, Finland, Denmark, and Iceland. Athletes must be 19 years of age or younger by December 31 of the year the championship is held. Men compete in the decathlon and women compete in the heptathlon. In the early history of the competition, the women's pentathlon was held instead of heptathlon.

The competition was first held in 1969 as part of the Nordic Combined Events Championships. When the senior event folded after 1970, the junior event was established in its own right in 1974.

Editions

References

Editions
Competition Venues. Nordic Athletics. Retrieved 2019-08-13.

Nordic Athletics competitions
Recurring sporting events established in 1969
1969 establishments in Norway
Under-20 athletics competitions
Combined events competitions